Justin Time is a Canadian animated television series created by Brandon James Scott and developed by Frank Falcone, Mary Bredin, and James Scott. Justin Time airs on Family Jr. in English and Télémagino in French in Canada, TiJi in French in France and Russian in Russia, Discovery Kids in Latin American Spanish in Latin America and Brazilian Portuguese in Brazil, Nickelodeon Junior in French in France, Cartoonito and Disney Junior in Italian in Italy, Hop! in Hebrew in Israel, Clan in Castilian Spanish in Spain, Universal Kids (known as Sprout) and Qubo in the United States, Tiny Pop in the United Kingdom, and Duronto TV in Bengali in Bangladesh. Bangladeshi firstly Indians then now he.

The series was premiered on September 22, 2011, and the series finale aired on June 24, 2016, after 76 segments. 39 episodes were produced.

Overview
The series revolves around the adventures of Justin. In every episode, Justin encounters a problem of everyday childhood (such as sharing, teamwork, or paying attention). Then, Justin and his shape-shifting sidekick Squidgy solve the problems by tackling them in adventures through time and around the world. In every adventure, Justin and Squidgy meet their best friend Olive, who always lives in the place and time they are visiting, and who usually needs their help to accomplish a task. Together, the three of them encounter the same problem that Justin faces in his world, and together they solve the problem before he gets called back by his parents to his world.

In the original concept, Justin travelled via a time machine, which led to the title "Justin Time". Because the concept of "the past" is challenging for preschoolers, the TV series instead focuses on more developmentally appropriate adventures of fun.

The Canadian flag is blue and white in the theme song instead of its official red and white.

In November 2014, it was announced that Netflix and Disney Junior Canada commissioned a new order of Justin Time episodes. The 13 half-hour episodes were released in spring 2016 as Justin Time Go.

Justin Time was nominated for a 2013 Daytime Emmy Award for Outstanding Preschool Animated Program, and twice for an Annie Award for Best Animated Television Production For Preschool Children. It was also nominated for three Canadian Screen Awards, in the Best Pre-School Program or Series category, winning one in 2014.

Episodes

Characters

Main
 Justin (voiced by Gage Munroe in Season 1-Season 2 and Drew Davis in Season 3): A happy eight-year-old boy with a positive outlook on life. He likes to jump into the action, and he’s always on the go. Justin is the leader of the team and he likes to take charge, even if he isn’t always sure he is going in the right direction. He is an "action boy" and never hesitates to dive into an adventure. Justin learns life skills in each episode. He is a caring person; he looks after his friends Olive and Squidgy. He's empathetic and is able to learn from his own mistakes and from the mistakes of others.
 Olive (voiced by Jenna Warren): A 13-year-old girl that stands for friendship in Justin Time. She appears in every place that Justin and Squidgy visit and is the first friend they meet as each adventure starts. She has black hair; her hair and attire always change to match the adventure. Usually through Olive's job, the trio encounters the problem that needs to be solved.
 Squidgy (voiced by Scott McCord): A big source of fun and comedy in Justin Time. He is described as "a tub of Kooky Clay come to life". Squidgy tends to want to befriend everyone and everything – from great furry mammoths to gangly pirates. He can speak to all animals except snakes, which he is afraid of.

Supporting
 Emily (voiced by Heather Bambrick): Justin's caring mother.
 Olive's Grandpa
 Cinderella: She is a young princess. 
 Monty the mammoth: A mammoth.
 Cleopatra: A museum princess girl.
 Dawn: A girl that wears a brown hat, a white shirt, and brown vest.
 Pierre: A friend of Justin and Squidgy.
 Sammy: Justin’s neighbor.

References

External links
 Justin Time on Family Jr. (Canada)
 Justin Time on Sprout (USA)
 Justin Time on Tiny Pop (UK)
 Justin Time on Clan (Spain)

2010s Canadian animated television series
2011 Canadian television series debuts
2016 Canadian television series endings
NBC original programming
Family Jr. original programming
Canadian computer-animated television series
Canadian preschool education television series
Television shows set in Toronto
Netflix children's programming
English-language Netflix original programming
Canadian children's animated science fantasy television series
Animated television series about children
2010s Canadian time travel television series
Animated preschool education television series
2010s preschool education television series